Kamogawa Dam  is a gravity dam located in Hyogo Prefecture in Japan. The dam is used for irrigation. The catchment area of the dam is 79.2 km2. The dam impounds about 54  ha of land when full and can store 8675 thousand cubic meters of water. The construction of the dam was started on 1947 and completed in 1951.

See also
List of dams in Japan

References

Dams in Hyogo Prefecture